The crucifix sea catfish (Sciades proops) — also known as the Christfish, the crucifix/crucifex catfish, the crucifixfish, or the gillbacker, — is a species of catfish in the family Ariidae. 

This fish was described by Achille Valenciennes in 1840, originally under the genus Bagrus. It inhabits  marine, brackish and freshwaters ranging from Brazil to Colombia. Its maximum known life expectancy is 4 years.

The crucifix sea catfish spawns from October–May. It is harvested by commercial fisheries, and its meat is marketed fresh.

Diet
The crucifix sea catfish has an extensive diet, consisting largely of crustaceans such as crabs in the genera Callinectes (C. bocourti, C. danae, and C. ornatus), Petrolisthes, and Porcellana (P. sayana); shrimp and prawns in the genera Alpheus, Exhippolysmata (E. oplophoroides), Nematopalaemon (N. schmitti), Penaeus (P. schmitti), and Xiphopenaeus (X. kroyeri); and isopods. It also feeds largely on eels in the families Muraenesocidae and Ophichthidae, and other bony fish in the genera Anchoa, Aspistor (A. quadriscutis), Cathorops ( C. arenatus, C. phrygiatus and C. rugispinis), Evermannichthys, Gobioides, Plagioscion, Pseudauchenipterus (P. nodosus), Stellifer (S. microps and S. rastrifer), Synbranchus (S. marmoratus), and Trichiurus. It also feeds on annelid, polychaete and roundworms, as well as ariid larvae, insects, gastropods, and leaves and twigs from terrestrial plants.

References

Ariidae
Taxa named by Achille Valenciennes
Fish described in 1840